The 1906 New York Giants season was the franchise's 24th season. The team finished in second place in the National League with a 96–56 record, 20 games behind the Chicago Cubs.

Regular season

Season standings

Record vs. opponents

Notable transactions 
 July 13, 1906: Doc Marshall and Sam Mertes were traded by the Giants to the St. Louis Cardinals for Spike Shannon.

Roster

Player stats

Batting

Starters by position 
Note: Pos = Position; G = Games played; AB = At bats; H = Hits; Avg. = Batting average; HR = Home runs; RBI = Runs batted in

Other batters 
Note: G = Games played; AB = At bats; H = Hits; Avg. = Batting average; HR = Home runs; RBI = Runs batted in

Pitching

Starting pitchers 
Note: G = Games pitched; IP = Innings pitched; W = Wins; L = Losses; ERA = Earned run average; SO = Strikeouts

Other pitchers 
Note: G = Games pitched; IP = Innings pitched; W = Wins; L = Losses; ERA = Earned run average; SO = Strikeouts

Relief pitchers 
Note: G = Games pitched; W = Wins; L = Losses; SV = Saves; ERA = Earned run average; SO = Strikeouts

Awards and honors

League top five finishers 
Red Ames
 #3 in NL in strikeouts (156)

Roger Bresnahan
 #2 in NL in on-base percentage (.419)

Art Devlin
 #3 in NL in stolen bases (54)

Joe McGinnity
 MLB leader in wins (27)

Sammy Strang
 MLB leader in on-base percentage (.423)
 #3 in NL in slugging percentage (.434)

References

External links
1906 New York Giants season at Baseball Reference

New York Giants (NL)
San Francisco Giants seasons
New York Giants season
New York G
1900s in Manhattan
Washington Heights, Manhattan